The 2016 Finnish Figure Skating Championships took place between December 18 and 20, 2015 in Mikkeli. Skaters competed in the disciplines of men's singles, ladies' singles, and ice dancing on the senior and junior levels. The results were one of the criteria used to choose the Finnish teams to the 2016 World Championships, 2016 European Championships, and 2016 World Junior Championships.

Results

Men

Ladies

Ice dance

Junior results

Men

Ladies

Ice dance

External links
 2016 Finnish Championships results

Finnish Figure Skating Championships
Finnish Figure Skating Championships, 2016
2015 in figure skating
2015 in Finnish sport
Finnish Figure Skating Championships, 2016